Bengaluru District was a district in the state of Karnataka, India. In 1986, Bangalore District was bifurcated into Bengaluru Urban district and Bengaluru Rural district.

Former districts of India